Eamon O'Neill (born 15 September 1944) is an Irish Social Democratic and Labour Party (SDLP) politician who was a  Member of the Northern Ireland Assembly (MLA) for South Down from 1998 to 2003.
 
Born in Emyvale, County Monaghan, O'Neill studied at St Mary's College in Strawberry Hill, then with the Open University.  He began working as a teacher in St. Malachy's High School in 1968, serving as Vice Principal from 1986–1998 and over-seeing the school's transition to A-levels. Eamon has been a community leader in the Castlewellan and Newcastle area since the Northern Ireland Civil Rights Movement. In 1977 he was elected to Down District Council for the Social Democratic and Labour Party (SDLP), and has now served on the Council for 34 years.

At the 1998 Northern Ireland Assembly election, O'Neill was elected in South Down.  However, he narrowly lost his seat at the 2003 election and failed to regain it at the 2011 elections. Eamon was later Chair of Down District Council.

References

Biography – Eamonn ONeill, Northern Ireland Assembly

1944 births
Living people
Alumni of the Open University
Northern Ireland MLAs 1998–2003
Social Democratic and Labour Party MLAs
Members of Down District Council
Politicians from County Down